Song Qian may refer to:

Song Qian (Eastern Wu) (宋謙), military general of Eastern Wu during the Three Kingdoms period of China
Song Qian (宋茜, born 1987), also known as Victoria Song, Chinese singer and actress